Patricia Castañeda (born February 16, 1977) is a Colombian actress. The recipient of numerous accolades, including an India Catalina Award for best leading Actress, Cartagena Film Festival (Festival de Cine de Cartagena) a Tv y Novelas Award.

Biography
Born in Cali, Colombia. she began her acting career in the early 1990s, appearing in Colombian kids show La Brújula Mágica After that she landed the lead character in the TV series Tiempos Dificiles and was nominee for best actress in the Cartagena Film Festival (Festival de Cine de Cartagena). She then moved to New York City and studied acting in HB Studio for three years at the same time that she took creative writing courses with Robert Auleta in School of Visual Arts.

Caracol TV called her back to join the cast of the year's best comedy Pecados Capitales. Then came the lead role in La Saga, La Tormenta and her first film: Otros directed by Oscar Campo. In 2006 was cast as Valeria, a small role in the movie Satanas directed by Andi Baiz, the reporter in the short film Ciudad Cronica which won at the Bogotá Film Festival, and Grand Lady in the film Love in the Time of Cholera directed by Mike Newell. In 2004 she became one of the first celebrities to take part in a reality show; Desafio 2004 together with El Pibe Valderrama. In 2009 she was cast in the comedy show Caméra Café and in 2010 joined the TV series Los Caballeros las Prefieren Brutas, the first original series made by Sony Entertainment Television playing the role of Hannah de la Aspriella. In 2011, Sony Entertainment Television started shooting the second season. She landed the lead role in the Norwegian film Handle with Care directed by Adril Andresen. In 2015 she had a supporting role in the film Moria directed by Claudio Cataño and was nominee for best supporting actress by the Academia Colombiana de Cine the Macondo Awards. Other series she has performed in include: La Ley del corazon, Nadie me Quita lo Bailao the film Pacifico directed by Argentinian director GG. In 2018 she landed the leading role in the series Debora, la mujer que desnudo a Colombia about the painter form Medellin who was banned by the church, silenced by the government and attacked by society for being a woman painting nudes. with this role Castañeda received the best award by Premios India catalina

Castañeda is one of the few, if not the only, actress who has published her writings. She started writing for SoHo magazine in 2004, and was asked to have her own column: "El Closet". The column was somehow irreverent and very free spirit maybe due to her New York stories, and created controversy all over the country. She talked without mystery about partying in the 21st century, love, sex and romance. On 2005 she wrote her first book Manual para Salir de la Tusa (Guide to get over heart breaks) a funny and satirical piece, published by Editorial Norma, a best seller for over a year in Colombia. Sporadic articles for news papers and magazine came along until the newspaper El País published one short story "El Palo de Golf" which later made part of a series of 10 short stories La noche del Demonio (The Night of the Demon), published in 2007 by Villegas Editores. For a year and a half she wrote a column in la Revista Cromos magazine: Profundamente light, where using her freshness and kind of naive way of approaching live, she pictured today's way of relating "girls have to have nice legs, nice smiles and a nice brain".

In 2022, it was announced that Castañeda had written and will produce a feature film on the life of the late Colombian suffragist and Senator Esmeralda Arboleda Cadavid, starring Julieth Restrepo.

Publications
In December 2010, Castañeda published her first novel, Virginia Casta, with Villegas Editores. This novel which took her one-year to write is a romantic comedy, with a witty and very romantic taste that puts the protagonist in a daunting situation when she finds out, by the tarot reading given by her grandmother, that she will drown, lose her job and marry the other guy. so far, Virginia Casta is already in second edition. The novel was taken into film by actor/director Claudio Cataño. She has been married to Claudio Cataño for seven years.

Filmography

Television 
 Tiempos Dificiles (1996)
 Pecados Capitales (2002)
 La Saga (2004)
 La Tormenta (2006)
 Vuelo 1503 2007
 Camara Cafe 2008
 Los Caballeros las Prefieren Brutas
 La Ley del corazon 2015
 El laberinto de Alicia 2016
 Nadie me quita lo bailao 2016
 Debora, la mujer que desnudo a Colombia 2018

Films 
 Satanas (2006)
 Love in the Time of Cholera(2006)
 Passing by 2008
 Yo soy Otro 2008
 La vida era en serio 2009
 Moria 2015
 Pacifico 2016
 Handle with care 2017
 Virginia Casta 2017

India Catalina Awards

2010

India Catalina Award for Outstanding Performance by a Female Actor in a
Leading Role

Tiempos Dificiles

Nominee

2017

India Catalina Award for Outstanding Performance by a Female Actor in a
Supporting  Role.

El laberinto de Alicia

Nominee

2019

India Catalina Award for Outstanding Performance by a Female Actor in a
Leading Role

Debora

Won

Tv y Novelas Awards

2017

TV y Novelas Award for Outstanding Performance by a Female Actor in a
Supporting Role

El laberinto de Alicia

Won

References

External links

 twitter Patricia

1977 births
Colombian actresses
Colombian women writers
Living people
People from Cali